The 31st parallel north is a circle of latitude that is 31 degrees north of the Earth's equatorial plane. It crosses Africa, Asia, the Pacific Ocean, North America and the Atlantic Ocean. At this latitude the sun is visible for 14 hours, 10 minutes during the summer solstice and 10 hours, 8 minutes during the winter solstice.

Part of the border between Iran and Iraq is defined by the parallel.

In the United States, it defines part of the border between the states of Mississippi and Louisiana, and most of the border between Alabama and Florida. Andrew Ellicott surveyed this parallel in 1797, which in Pinckney's Treaty two years before had been defined as the border between the United States and the Spanish territory of West Florida.

Around the world
Starting at the Prime Meridian and heading eastwards, the parallel 31° north passes through:

{| class="wikitable plainrowheaders"
! scope="col" width="125" | Co-ordinates
! scope="col" | Country, territory or sea
! scope="col" | Notes
|-
| 
! scope="row" | 
|
|-
| 
! scope="row" | 
|
|-
| 
! scope="row" | 
|
|-
| style="background:#b0e0e6;" | 
! scope="row" style="background:#b0e0e6;" | Mediterranean Sea
| style="background:#b0e0e6;" | Gulf of Sidra
|-
| 
! scope="row" | 
|
|-
| 
! scope="row" | 
|
|-
| style="background:#b0e0e6;" | 
! scope="row" style="background:#b0e0e6;" | Mediterranean Sea
| style="background:#b0e0e6;" |
|-
| 
! scope="row" | 
|
|-
| 
! scope="row" | 
| Passing just north of Yeruham
|-
| 
! scope="row" | 
|
|-
| 
! scope="row" | 
| Passing through Arar
|-
| 
! scope="row" | 
| Passing through Nasiriyah
|-
| 
! scope="row" |  /  border
|
|-
| 
! scope="row" | 
|
|-
| 
! scope="row" | 
|
|-valign="top"
| 
! scope="row" | 
| Balochistan Punjab
|-valign="top"
| 
! scope="row" | 
| Punjab Himachal Pradesh Uttarakhand
|-valign="top"
| 
! scope="row" | 
| Tibet  Sichuan  Chongqing  Hubei  Anhui  Zhejiang  Jiangsu  Zhejiang - for about  Jiangsu - for about  Zhejiang - for about  Shanghai
|-
| style="background:#b0e0e6;" | 
! scope="row" style="background:#b0e0e6;" | East China Sea
| style="background:#b0e0e6;" |
|-
| 
! scope="row" | 
| Cape Sata, the southernmost point of the island of Kyūshū
|-
| style="background:#b0e0e6;" | 
! scope="row" style="background:#b0e0e6;" | Pacific Ocean
| style="background:#b0e0e6;" |
|-
| 
! scope="row" | 
| Baja California
|-
| style="background:#b0e0e6;" | 
! scope="row" style="background:#b0e0e6;" | Gulf of California
| style="background:#b0e0e6;" |
|-
| 
! scope="row" | 
|SonoraChihuahua
|-valign="top"
| 
! scope="row" | 
| TexasLouisianaMississippi / Louisiana borderMississippiAlabamaAlabama / Florida borderGeorgia
|-
| style="background:#b0e0e6;" | 
! scope="row" style="background:#b0e0e6;" | Atlantic Ocean
| style="background:#b0e0e6;" |
|-
| 
! scope="row" | 
|
|-
| 
! scope="row" | 
|
|}

See also
30th parallel north
32nd parallel north

References

n31
Iran–Iraq border
Borders of Mississippi
Borders of Florida
Borders of Alabama
Borders of Louisiana